The CB class was a group of midget submarines built for the Italian Navy during World War II. However, they were also used by several other navies, seeing action in the Mediterranean and in the Black Sea.

Construction and specifications
The submarines were designed and built by Caproni. They were used as coastal defence units, being a significant improvement of the previous . Each unit had a standard (surfaced) displacement of 35.4 tons and a submerged displacement of 44.3 tons. Each boat was armed with two externally-mounted  torpedoes, each tube could be reloaded without removing the vessel from water. The two torpedoes could also be replaced by two mines. Each boat had a crew of four, aided in navigation by a small conning tower.

Service
Seventy-two boats were ordered from Caproni in Milan, but only 22 were laid down. Twelve boats were completed before the Italian Armistice and nine afterwards.

Black Sea

The first six boats, completed in 1941, were transferred to the Black Sea by rail, after Nazi Germany asked for Italian naval support on the Eastern Front. They departed on 25 April 1942 and reached the Romanian port of Constanța on 2 May. They formed the 1st Squadriglia Sommergibili CB, under the overall command of Francesco Mimbelli. They fought against the Soviet Black Sea Fleet, CB-5 being sunk at Yalta in June 1942, either by Soviet aircraft or by a torpedo boat. In late 1942, the remaining five submarines were refitted at the Constanța Shipyard in Romania. On 26 August 1943, CB-4 torpedoed and sank the Soviet  submarine Shch-203.

After the Allied armistice with Italy in September 1943, the five Black Sea submarines (CB-1, CB-2, CB-3, CB-4 and CB-6) were transferred to the Royal Romanian Navy. They were all scuttled in the Black Sea in August 1944, after King Michael's Coup.

Four of the Black Sea submarines (CB-1, CB-2, CB-3 and CB-4) were captured by Soviet forces in August 1944 and commissioned on 20 October as TM-4, TM-5, TM-6 and TM-7. They were stricken on 16 February 1945 and subsequently scrapped.

Mediterranean
The first six boats were unsuccessfully employed as submarine hunters near Naples and Salerno, before being transferred to the Black Sea in early 1942. The second squadron (CB-7, CB-8, CB-9, CB-10, CB-11, CB-12) was completed just before the Armistice, in August 1943. All of them, except CB-7 (later cannibalized for spare parts), defected to the Allies. CB-13, CB-14, CB-15 and CB-16 were captured by the Germans, but all except CB-16 were destroyed by Allied air attacks. CB-16 was assigned to the 10th Flotilla of the National Republican Navy, the navy of the Italian Social Republic, but its crew mutinied and surrendered the boat to the British. The last squadron to be completed carried out patrol missions and landed saboteurs. CB-17 was sunk during an air attack, CB-18 was scuttled by her own crew, CB-19 was turned over to the Allies, CB-20 was captured by Yugoslav Partisans, CB-21 was accidentally rammed by a German landing craft and CB-22 was either sunk in an air attack or scuttled by her own crew.

List of submarines

See also
 Italian submarines of World War II

References

Further reading

External links
 Classe CB Marina Militare website

Submarine classes
Submarines of the Regia Marina
Midget submarines
 CB class
Caproni
Ships built in Italy
World War II submarines of Romania